Coleophora margarita is a moth of the family Coleophoridae.

The larvae feed on Caroxylon turkestanicum. They feed on the generative organs of their host plant.

References

margarita
Moths described in 1989